Goug (also known as El Goug) is a village in the commune of Balidat Ameur, in Témacine District, Ouargla Province, Algeria.

References

Neighbouring towns and cities

Populated places in Ouargla Province